Terry Moran  is an American journalist, currently Senior National Correspondent at ABC News. Based in Washington, D.C., Moran covers national politics and policy, reporting from the Trump White House, the Supreme Court, and the campaign trail for all ABC News programs.  Previously, Moran served as ABC's Chief Foreign Correspondent from 2013-2018; as co-anchor of the ABC News show Nightline from 2005-2013; and as Chief White House Correspondent from 1999-2005.

Biography
Moran was born in Chicago, Illinois and grew up in Mount Prospect, Illinois and Barrington Hills, Illinois. He graduated from Lawrence University in 1982, where he majored in English and edited the school newspaper, The Lawrentian. After leaving Lawrence, Moran received a Thomas J. Watson Fellowship for "purposeful, independent exploration outside the United States, awarded to graduating seniors nominated by one of 40 partner colleges." Moran's project focused on economic development, with an emphasis on foreign capital investment, in four rural communities of the West of Ireland.

Career

Moran began his journalism career at The New Republic magazine and then worked as a reporter and editor at the Washington D.C.-based Legal Times. From 1992 through 1997, Moran worked as a news correspondent and anchor for Court TV, where he rose to national prominence covering the trials in Los Angeles of Lyle and Erik Menendez and O. J. Simpson, as well as for his reporting on the Bosnian war crimes trials at The Hague and the U.S. Supreme Court confirmation hearings for justices Clarence Thomas, Stephen Breyer, and Ruth Bader Ginsburg.

Moran joined ABC News in 1997. After having served as the primary correspondent assigned to the U.S. Supreme Court from 1998 to 1999, he was ABC News' Chief White House Correspondent from September 1999 to November 2005, covering the presidencies of Bill Clinton and George W. Bush.  Prior to his White House assignment, Moran covered Vice President Al Gore's presidential campaign.

As co-anchor of Nightline, Moran continued his political coverage, reporting on the presidential campaigns of 2008 and 2012, the rise of the Tea Party, and other major developments. He also traveled frequently overseas, covering the wars in Iraq and Afghanistan, and the "Arab Spring" uprisings in Egypt, Libya, and Syria. As ABC's Chief Foreign Correspondent, Moran led the network's coverage on major international stories, from Brexit, to the migrant crisis in Europe, to the civil wars Syria and Ukraine, to major terror attacks in London, Paris, Brussels, Berlin, and elsewhere.

Over the years, Moran's journalism work has been recognized with many awards, including the George Foster Peabody Award, the Emmy Award, the Merriman Smith Award from the White House Correspondents' Association (twice), and the Thurgood Marshall Journalism Award.

When he was named ABC's Chief Foreign Correspondent, the then-president of ABC News Ben Sherwood said, "Terry's range as a reporter is exceptional.  He is equally adept interviewing a confessed hit man in one of Mexico's most notorious gangs as he is breaking down some of the most complex Supreme Court decisions...A brilliant writer and gifted storyteller, Terry has the ability to see the story no one else sees, explain its importance to the audience, and do it all in a stylish and compelling way."

Personal
Moran married twice. He married his first wife Karen Osler in the late 1980s. In 2015, he became engaged to his second wife, Johanna Cox, a Chinese language linguist and China intelligence analyst who previously worked as a journalist at Elle magazine. She was the winner of the reality TV show Stylista. The couple has three children. Moran also has a child from his first marriage.

References

External links
Bio
ABC News Blog

 
American television news anchors
American television reporters and correspondents
Living people
ABC News personalities
American expatriates in the United Kingdom
Lawrence University alumni
People from Chicago
20th-century American journalists
American male journalists
21st-century American journalists
Year of birth missing (living people)